Capital  is a 2012 French drama film directed by Costa-Gavras, about ruthless ambition, power struggle, greed and deception in the international world of finance.

Plot 
The film follows an executive who is appointed the new CEO of a large French bank, and upsets the bank's board of directors when he begins to take unilateral control of the bank, laying off a large number of employees and making a corrupt deal with the head of an American hedge fund.

Main cast
 Gad Elmaleh as Marc Tourneuil
 Gabriel Byrne as Dittmar Rigule
 Natacha Régnier as Diane Tourneuil
 Céline Sallette as Maud Baron
 Liya Kebede as Nassim
 Hippolyte Girardot as Raphaël Sieg
 Daniel Mesguich as Jack Marmande
 Olga Grumberg as Claude Marmande
 Bernard Le Coq as Antoine de Suze
 Yann Sundberg as Boris Breton
 Claire Nadeau as Marc's mother
 Marie-Christine Adam as Diane's Mother
 Astrid Whettnall as Marilyne Gauthier
 Vincent Nemeth as Alain Faure

Reception
The film received slightly above average reviews during its initial appearance at various film festivals.

It was the closing film at the Festival International du Film Indépendant de Bordeaux in Bordeaux, France. It was nominated for the Golden Shell for best film, the Silver Shell for Best Director and the special jury prize at the 2012 San Sebastián International Film Festival and a FIPRESCI prize at the 2012 Toronto International Film Festival.

The film began regular public showings on 14 November 2012.

Shown at 36th annual Mill Valley Film Festival, at the Christopher B Smith Film Centre on 4 October 2013.  Costa-Gavras was present and answered questions at a Q&A conducted by Peter Coyote.

References

External links 
 
 
 Capital - Cohen Media Group (US Distributor)

2012 films
2010s French-language films
Films directed by Costa Gavras
Films set in London
Films set in New York City
Films set in Paris
French drama films
2012 drama films
Trading films
2010s French films